Novoalexandrovka is a rural locality (a selo) in Starooskolsky District, Belgorod Oblast, Russia. The population was 132 as of 2010. There is 1 street.

Geography 
Novoalexandrovka is located 59 km southeast of Stary Oskol (the district's administrative centre) by road. Shidlovka is the nearest rural locality.

References 

Rural localities in Starooskolsky District